Lieutenant Colonel William Henry Dick-Cunyngham VC (16 June 1851 – 6 January 1900) was a Scottish recipient of the Victoria Cross, the highest and most prestigious award for gallantry in the face of the enemy that can be awarded to British and Commonwealth forces.

Background
Dick-Cunynigham was the youngest son of Sir William Hanmer Dick-Cunyngham, 8th Baronet of Prestonfield and Lambrughton. The family lived at Prestonfield House in south Edinburgh.

Military career and VC details
He was 28 years old, and a lieutenant in The Gordon Highlanders, British Army during the Second Anglo-Afghan War when the following deed took place on 13 December 1879 during the attack on the Sherpur Pass, Afghanistan for which he was awarded the VC.

In 1899 he was appointed in command of the 2nd Battalion Gordon Highlanders, which was sent to South Africa for the Second Boer War.

While in South Africa, he was mortally wounded in action at the siege of Ladysmith on 6 January 1900 and died the following day, 7 January.

Medal and memorials
His Victoria Cross is displayed at the Gordon Highlanders Museum, Aberdeen, Scotland.

His grave is in Ladysmith Cement in South Africa. and his name appears on the Boer War Memorial in Cheltenham England.

He is also memorialised with his siblings in Duddingston Kirkyard in Edinburgh. A memorial tablet inside the church remembers his only son, St John  William Keith Dick-Cunyngham who was drowned near the family home of Philorth Castle in 1897 while trying to rescue his best friend.

References

 Monuments to Courage (David Harvey, 1999)
 The Register of the Victoria Cross (This England, 1997)
 Scotland's Forgotten Valour (Graham Ross, 1995)

External links

 

1851 births
1900 deaths
British recipients of the Victoria Cross
Gordon Highlanders officers
British military personnel killed in the Second Boer War
British Army personnel of the Second Boer War
Military personnel from Edinburgh
Second Anglo-Afghan War recipients of the Victoria Cross
British Army recipients of the Victoria Cross